Tug of war (also known as tug o' war, tug war, rope war, rope pulling, or tugging war) is a sport that pits two teams against each other in a test of strength: teams pull on opposite ends of a rope, with the goal being to bring the rope a certain distance in one direction against the force of the opposing team's pull.

Terminology
The Oxford English Dictionary says that the phrase "tug of war" originally meant "the decisive contest; the real struggle or tussle; a severe contest for supremacy". Only in the 19th century was it used as a term for an athletic contest between two teams who haul at the opposite ends of a rope. Prior to that, French and English was the commonly used name for the game in the English-speaking world.

Origin

The origins of tug of war are uncertain, but this sport was practised in Cambodia, ancient Egypt, Greece, India and China. According to a Tang dynasty book, The Notes of Feng, tug of war, under the name "hook pulling" (牽鉤), was used by the military commander of the State of Chu during the Spring and Autumn period (8th to 5th centuries BC) to train warriors. Each side also had its own team of drummers to encourage the participants.

In ancient Greece the sport was called helkystinda (Greek: ἑλκυστίνδα), ephelkystinda (ἐφελκυστίνδα) and dielkystinda (διελκυστίνδα), which derives from dielkō (διέλκω), meaning amongst others "I pull through", all deriving from the verb helkō (ἕλκω), "I draw, I pull". Helkystinda and ephelkystinda seem to have been ordinary versions of tug of war, while dielkystinda had no rope, according to Julius Pollux. It is possible that the teams held hands when pulling, which would have increased difficulty, since handgrips are more difficult to sustain than a grip of a rope. Tug of war games in ancient Greece were among the most popular games used for strength and would help build strength needed for battle in full armor.

Archeological evidence shows that tug of war was also popular in India in the 12th century:

Tug of war stories about heroic champions from Scandinavia and Germany circulate Western Europe where Viking warriors pull on animal skins over open pits of fire in tests of strength and endurance, in preparation for battle and plunder.

1500 and 1600 – tug of war is popularised during tournaments in French châteaux gardens and later in Great Britain

1800 – tug of war begins a new tradition among seafaring men who were required to tug on lines to adjust sails while ships were under way and even in battle.

The Mohave people occasionally used tug-of-war matches as means of settling disputes.

As a sport

There are tug of war clubs in many countries, and both men and women participate.

The sport was part of the Olympic Games from 1900 until 1920, but has not been included since. The sport is part of the World Games. The Tug of War International Federation (TWIF), organises World Championships for nation teams biannually, for both indoor and outdoor contests, and a similar competition for club teams.

In England the sport was formally governed by the AAA until 1984, but is now catered for by the Tug of War Association (formed in 1958), and the Tug of War Federation of Great Britain (formed in 1984). In Scotland, the Scottish Tug of War Association was formed in 1980. The sport also features in Highland Games.

Between 1976 and 1988 Tug of War was a regular event during the television series Battle of the Network Stars. Teams of celebrities representing each major network competed in different sporting events culminating into the final event, the Tug of War. Lou Ferrigno's  epic tug of war performance in May 1979 is considered the greatest feat in 'Battle' history.

National organizations

The sport is played almost in every country in the world. However, a small selection of countries have set up a national body to govern the sport. Most of these national bodies are associated with the international governing body: TWIF, The Tug of War International Federation. As of 2008 there are 53 countries associated with TWIF, among which are Scotland, Ireland, England, India, Switzerland, Belgium, Italy, South Africa and the United States.

Regional variations

Burma (Myanmar)
In Myanmar (Burma), the tug of war, called lun hswe has both cultural and historical origins. It features as an important ritual in phongyibyan, the ceremonial cremation of high-ranking Buddhist monks, whereby the funerary pyres are tugged between opposite sides. The tug of war is also used as a traditional rainmaking custom, called mo khaw, to encourage rain. The tradition originated during the reign of King Shinmahti in the Bagan Era. The Rakhine people also hold tug of war ceremonies called yatha hswe pwe (ရထားဆွဲပွဲ) during the Burmese month of Tabodwe.

Indonesia 

In Indonesia, Tarik Tambang is a popular sport held in many events, such as the Indonesian Independence Day celebration, school events, and scout events. The rope used is called dadung, made from fibers of lar between two jousters. Two cinder blocks are placed a distance apart and the two jousters stand upon the blocks with a rope stretched between them. The objective for each jouster is to either a) cause their opponent to fall off their block, or b) to take their opponent's end of the rope from them.

Japan 

The tug-of-war is also a traditional way to pray  for a plentiful harvest throughout Japan and is a popular ritual around the country. The Kariwano Tug-of-war in Daisen, Akita, is said to be more than 500 years old, and is also a national folklore cultural asset. The Underwater Tug-of-War Festival in Mihama, Fukui is 380 years old, and takes place every January. The Sendai Great Tug of War in Satsumasendai, Kagoshima is known as Kenka-zuna or "brawl tug". The event is said to have been started by feudal warlord Yoshihiro Shimadzu, with the aim of boosting the morale of his soldiers before the decisive Battle of Sekigahara in 1600. Nanba Hachiman Jinja's tug-of-war, which started in the Edo period, is Osaka's folklore cultural asset. The Naha Tug-of-war in Okinawa is also famous.

Korea 

Juldarigi (also chuldarigi) is a traditional Korean sport similar to tug of war. It has a ritual and divinatory significance to many agricultural communities in the country and is performed at festivals and community gatherings. The sport uses two huge rice-straw ropes, connected by a central peg, which is pulled by teams representing the East and West sides of the village (the competition is often rigged in favor of the Western team). A number of religious and traditional rituals are performed before and after the actual competition.

About more information of two huge rice-straw ropes, In Korea's tug-of-war, not only the act of pulling a rope but also the process of making the rope is viewed as an intangible cultural heritage. Cut the rope, twist the 10 strings together, hang them in a frame, and tighten them firmly. And then collect the lines again to make a bigger line. It is said that children and teenagers played in advance with pre-made baby strings depending on the region. This process began as early as a month before the tug-of-war, and because it could never be made alone, it was possible to develop a sense of community cooperation in the process of making it.

The rope made varies depending on the region, but it is said to be 0.5m-1.4m in diameter and 40m-60m in length. Therefore, it is difficult to hold this rope directly and play tug-of-war, so it is a game that pulls this rope by holding a small rope, which is usually called a friend string, a copper string, and a side string. In addition, when making a string, it is made separately from a female rope and a male rope, and the head of the string is shaped like a noose or a coming. It is characterized by the wider width of the ditch compared to the male rope.

Several areas of Korea have their own distinct variations of juldarigi, and similar tug-of-war games with connections to agriculture are found in rural communities across Southeast Asia.

They also have a ritual games called Tugging rituals and games, with Cambodia, Philippines, Viet Nam, Korea has registered tug-of-war as a UNESCO Intangible Cultural Heritage in 2015.

New Zealand 
A variant, originally brought to New Zealand by Boston whalers in the 1790s, is played with five-person teams lying down on cleated boards. The sport is played at two clubs in Te Awamutu and Hastings, supported by the New Zealand Tug of War Association.

Peru 
The Peruvian children's series Nubeluz featured its own version of tug-of-war (called La Fuerza Glufica), where each team battled 3-on-3 on platforms suspended over a pool of water. The object was simply to pull the other team into the pool.

Poland 
In Poland, a version of tug of war is played using a dragon boat, where teams of 6 or 8 attempt to row towards each other.

Basque Country 
In the Basque Country, this sport is considered a popular rural sport, with many associations and clubs. In Basque, it is called Sokatira.

United States 
In the USA - A form of Tug of War using 8 handles is used in competition at camps, schools, churches, and other events. The rope is called an "Oct-O Pull" and provides two way, four way and 8-way competition for 8 to 16 participants at one time.
 Each Fourth of July, two California towns separated by an ocean channel Stinson Beach, California and Bolinas, California gather to compete in an annual tug-of-war.
 The towns of Leclaire, Iowa, and Port Byron, Illinois, compete in a tug of war across the Mississippi River every year in August since 1987 during Tug Fest.
 A special edition of the Superstars television series, called "The Superteams", features a tug-of-war, usually as the final event.
 The Battle of the Network Stars featured a tug-of-war as one of its many events.
 A game of tug-of-war, on tilted platforms, was used on the US, UK and Australian versions of the Gladiators television series, although the game was played with two sole opposing participants.
 The last known "Cleated" Tug-a-War, takes place in Tuolumne CA at the annual Tuolumne Lumber Jubilee. It takes place the weekend after Fathers Day.

Miami University 

Puddle Pull is a biannual tug of war contest held at Miami University.  The  event is a timed, seated variation of tug of war in which fraternities and sororities compete. In addition to the seated participants, each team has a caller who coordinates the movements of the team.

Although the university hosted an unrelated freshman vs. sophomores tug of war event in the 1910s and 1920s, the first record of modern Puddle Pull is its appearance as a tug of war event in the school's newspaper, The Miami Student, in May 1949. This fraternity event was created by Frank Dodd of the Miami chapter of Delta Upsilon.  Originally, the event was held as a standing tug of war over the Tallawanda stream near the Oxford waterworks bridge in which the losers were pulled into the water. This first event was later seen as a driving force for creating interfraternity competitive activities (Greek Week) at Miami University. As a part of moving to a seated event, a new rule was created in 1966 to prohibit locks and created the event that is seen today with the exception of a large pit that was still being dug in between the two teams. The event is held in a level grass field and uses a 1.5-inch diameter rope that is at least 50 feet long is used for the event. Footholes or "pits" are dug for each participant at 20-inch intervals. The pits are dug with a flat front and an angled back. Women began to compete sporadically starting in the 1960s and became regular participants as sorority teams in the mid-1980s.

Hope College 
The Hope College Pull is an annual tug-of-war contest held across the Black River in Holland, Michigan on the fourth Saturday after Labor Day. Competitors are 40 members of the freshman and sophomore classes.

Formal rules

The rope is marked with a "centre line" and two markings  to either side of the centre line. The teams start with the rope's centre line directly above a line marked on the ground, and once the contest (the "pull") has commenced, attempt to pull the other team such that the marking on the rope closest to their opponent crosses the centre line, or the opponents commit a foul.

Lowering one's elbow below the knee during a pull, known as "locking", is a foul, as is touching the ground for extended periods of time. The rope must go under the arms; actions such as pulling the rope over the shoulders may be considered a foul. These rules apply in highly organized competitions such as the World Championships. However, in small or informal entertainment competitions, the rules are often arbitrarily interpreted and followed.

A contest may feature a moat in a neutral zone, usually of mud or softened ground, which eliminates players who cross the zone or fall into it.

Tactics

Aside from the raw muscle power needed for tug of war, it is also a technical sport. The cooperation or "rhythm" of team members play an equally important role in victory, if not more, than their physical strength. To achieve this, a person called a "driver" is used to harmonize the team's joint traction power. The driver moves up and down next to their team pulling on the rope, giving orders to them when to pull and when to rest (called "hanging"). If the driver spots the opposing team trying to pull the driver's team away, the driver gives a "hang" command, each member will dig into the grass with their boots and movement of the rope is limited. When the opponents are played out, the driver shouts "pull" and rhythmically waves their hat or handkerchief for their team to pull together. Slowly but surely, the other team is forced into surrender by a runaway pull. Another factor that affects the game is the players' weights. The heavier someone is, the more static friction their feet have to the ground, and if there isn't enough friction and they weigh too little, even if they are pulling extremely hard, the force won't go into the rope. Their feet will simply slide along the ground if their opponent(s) have better static friction with the ground. In general, as long as one team has enough static friction and can pull hard enough to overcome the static friction of their opponent(s), that team can easily win the match.

Injury risks
In addition to injuries from falling and from back strains (some of which may be serious), catastrophic injuries may occur as a result of looping or wrapping the rope around a hand or wrist, or impact from snapback if the rope should break. This may cause permanent damage to the body, requiring finger, hand, or even arm amputations.

Amateur organizers of tugs of war may underestimate the forces generated and thus, may be unaware of the possible consequences if a rope snaps under extreme tension. Injury is primarily due to the large amount of potential energy stored in the rope during the competition. As both sides pull, tension is placed on the rope causing it to stretch as described by Hooke's law. If a rope exceeds its breaking point the potential energy is suddenly converted to kinetic energy and the broken ends of the rope will snapback at great speed, which can cause serious injuries. This phenomenon has been studied in ship operations as mooring ropes pose the same risk should they snap. For this reason, specially engineered tug of war ropes exist that can safely withstand the forces generated.

Notable incidents

In popular culture 
 The American game show Tug of Words uses a virtual tug of war as its central scoring mechanism.

Notes

Bibliography
 Henning Eichberg, "Pull and tug: Towards a philosophy of the playing 'You'", in: Bodily Democracy: Towards a Philosophy of Sport for All, London: Routledge 2010, pp. 180–199.

External links

 Tug of War International Federation
 The Tug of War Association (England)
 Tug of War (Sports123.com, via Wayback Machine, Internet Archive): list of winners in the main championships

 
Discontinued Summer Olympic disciplines in athletics
Former Summer Olympic sports
Games of physical skill
Metaphors referring to war and violence
Team sports
Intangible Cultural Heritage of Humanity